El Concierto Acústico is the first live album by the Puerto Rican rock band Fiel a la Vega, and their second album overall. The album was recorded at the Performing Arts Center in Guaynabo, Puerto Rico, during the concerts the band held on July 19–21, 1997. It was released later that year.

The album consists of acoustic versions of songs from the band's first album, Fiel a la Vega and cover versions of some of the artists that influenced them, including Roy Brown, Silvio Rodríguez and Leon Gieco. Brown himself made a guest appearance during his song "Boricua en la Luna". Other guest artists were Adean Cabán (son of Antonio Cabán Vale "El Topo") and Mike Villegas.

Track listing
 "Recuerdos de Borinquen / Las Flores de Emilio"
 "86'"
 "De Mi Casa y Mi Viento"
 "Fábula de los Tres Hermanos" (from S. Rodríguez)
 "Mil Canciones"
 "Buscando Guayaba" (from R. Blades)
 "Ojalá" (from S. Rodríguez)
 "Sólo le pido a Dios" (from L. Gieco)
 "Un Pueblo Durmiendo"
 "Boricua en la Luna" (from R. Brown/J.A. Corretjer)
 "En la Vida Todo es ir" (from R. Brown/J.A. Corretjer)
 "El Wanabí"
 "Los Superhéroes"
 "Una Plegaria Más"
 "Salimos de Aquí"

Personnel
 Tito Auger - lead vocals, rhythm guitar
 Ricky Laureano - lead guitar, vocals
 Jorge Arraiza - bass guitar
 Pedro Arraiza - drums
 Papo Román - percussion

Fiel a la Vega albums
1997 live albums